Sven-Ole Thorsen (born 24 September 1944) is a Danish actor, stuntman, bodybuilder and strongman competitor. Thorsen won Denmark's Strongest Man in 1983.

Using his stature he often plays imposing giants and villains in his films who are somehow beaten by smaller opponents in a David and Goliath manner, but he has also played heroic characters such as Gunnar the legendary warrior in The Viking Sagas. His autobiography Stærk mand i Hollywood (Strong Man in Hollywood) was published on 26 October 2007, and was very well reviewed. The first printing of the book reportedly sold out in 24 hours.

Career
He is known for his frequent appearances in Arnold Schwarzenegger movies, like Conan the Barbarian, as the hammer-wielding Thorgrim; The Running Man, as the ultimately-sympathetic bodyguard Sven; and in Predator as a Soviet advisor that executes a hostage. His other characters have included the boater-wearing security guard La Fours in Mallrats, the unbeaten fighting legend Tigris of Gaul in Gladiator, Lt. Michael 'Tank' Ellis, Ground Assault Unit in Captain Power, to the menacing alien villain Secundus in Abraxas, Guardian of the Universe, who is always hunting for the Anti-Life Equation without any success.

Thorsen has been credited in fifteen Arnold Schwarzenegger movies (twelve as actor, three as stuntman or trainer), making him Schwarzenegger's most frequent collaborator. It began with Conan the Barbarian, when Schwarzenegger brought Thorsen and other of his bodybuilder friends (like Franco Columbu) with him to shoot the movie. Later, when Thorsen moved to the United States, he met Schwarzenegger again while he was acting in the movie Commando. Thorsen helped with some of the stuntwork in that movie, and quickly found work in many of the subsequent Schwarzenegger films.

In spite of Thorsen's thick Danish accent, his voice is almost never dubbed (an exception being Hard Target). Thorsen pursued his role as Tigris (of Gaul) in Gladiator for over a year, beating Lou Ferrigno for the part. The part won him two TAURUS World Stunt Awards in the ceremony's inaugural year.

Thorsen has founded various federations, including The Danish Bodybuilding Federation in 1979 and Cigar Night at Schatzi in Santa Monica, California along with Schwarzenegger. He has a black belt in Shotokan karate and holds championship titles.

Personal life
Thorsen is 192 centimetres (6 feet, 3.5 inches) tall and while appearing in Conan the Barbarian (1982) he weighed 138 kilograms (304 lbs), according to his autobiography (page 24 & 110).

Thorsen lives in Santa Monica, California and had two dogs, a Jack Russell Terrier named Jake and an American Bull Terrier named Cleo (now deceased). He won the Danish "Show of Winners" Award of the Year 2006, honouring people who have a special affiliation with dogs.

Filmography

Notes
1  Arnold Schwarzenegger also appeared in this movie.

Television

References

External links
 
 

1944 births
Danish male film actors
Danish male karateka
Danish bodybuilders
Danish stunt performers
Danish male television actors
Living people
20th-century Danish male actors
21st-century Danish male actors
Male actors from Copenhagen
21st-century Danish sculptors
21st-century male artists